Leverage is the fourth studio album by the German folk metal band Lyriel.

Style
Among a mix of soft folk rock as well as symphonic metal and Gothic Metal it features a duet with Schandmaul vocalist Thomas Lindner. Leverage contains two songs "The Road Not Taken" and "Parting" that are based on lyrics by Robert Frost and Charlotte Brontë respectively On the extended edition there is a version of "Everything's Coming Up Roses" by Black.

Reception

Leverage received several positive reviews in Germany, Austria and the United Kingdom. It was however noted that the "album does lose some steam near its conclusion" and that the band should have dared to evolve towards harder metal songs. Metal Hammer Germany criticised also that many songs were drifting off towards "Celtic kitsch", and that Lyriel's new orientation towards Nightwish was only backed up by their instrumental performance but not by the vocals.

Track list
All music written by Oliver Thierjung, all lyrics written by Linda Laukamp, except where noted.

Personnel

Lyriel
Jessica Thierjung – vocals
Tim Sonnenstuhl – guitars
Steffen Feldmann – bass
Joon Laukamp – violin
Oliver Thierjung – guitars
Marcus Fidorra – drums
Linda Laukamp – cello, backing vocals

Additional personnel
Stefan Grawe – piano on "Wenn die Engel Fallen"
Thomas Lindner – vocals on "Wenn die Engel Fallen"
Sebastian Sonntag – vocals on "Voices in My Head"
Hiko – cover art, layout
Thomas Pleq Johansson – mixing
Sinan Muslu – photography
Patrick Temme – photography

References

2012 albums
Lyriel albums
AFM Records albums